The All-Ireland Senior Hurling Championship 1899 was the 13th series of the All-Ireland Senior Hurling Championship, Ireland's premier hurling knock-out competition.  Tipperary won the championship, beating Wexford 3-12 to 1–4 in the final.

Format

All-Ireland Championship

Final: (1 match) The Munster and Leinster champions play in this game to determine the All-Ireland champions.

Results

Leinster Senior Hurling Championship

Munster Senior Hurling Championship

All-Ireland Senior Hurling Championship

Championship statistics

Miscellaneous

 The All-Ireland final between Tipperary and Wexford was abandoned near the end.  Since Tipperary were winning by a considerable margin at that stage it was decided to award them the championship title.
 Tipperary win their 5th All-Ireland title to become outright leaders on the all-time roll of honour. It is a position they will retain until 1942.

References

Sources

 Corry, Eoghan, The GAA Book of Lists (Hodder Headline Ireland, 2005).
 Donegan, Des, The Complete Handbook of Gaelic Games (DBA Publications Limited, 2005).

1899
All-Ireland Senior Hurling Championship